Houcaris is a genus of tamisiocarididid radiodonts known from Cambrian Series 2 of China and the United States. It contains two species, Houcaris saron and Houcaris magnabasis, both of which were originally named as species of the related genus Anomalocaris. The genus Houcaris was established for the two species in 2021 and honors Hou Xianguang, who had discovered and named the type species Anomalocaris saron in 1995 along with his colleagues Jan Bergström and Per E. Ahlberg.

Species

Houcaris saron 
H. saron, known from Maotianshan Shale in Yunnan, is first described in 1995 as Anomalocaris saron. This species is only known from frontal appendages. There is a specimen (ELRC 20001) that is previously considered as whole body fossil of this species, but later study shows that this specimen is not belonging to this species, and later given own genus Innovatiocaris. Length of frontal appendage is up to at least 12 cm. Sometimes considered to belong to family Anomalocarididae or Amplectobeluidae.

Houcaris magnabasis 
H. magnabasis, known from Pioche Shale and Pyramid shale in Nevada, is originally described as Anomalocaris cf. saron in 2003, and later named as Anomalocaris magnabasis in 2019. This species is only known from frontal appendages and some partial fossils of oral cone (mouthpart) and flaps. Largest estimated length of frontal appendage is 17.5 cm. Sometimes considered to belong to family Anomalocarididae or Amplectobeluidae.

References

Cambrian arthropods of North America
Cambrian arthropods of Asia
Fossil taxa described in 2021

Cambrian genus extinctions